William Allen Mays (born February 5, 1944), known professionally as Bill Mays, is an American jazz pianist from Sacramento, California.

Biography
Mays came from a musical family and at the age of 15 became interested in jazz at an Earl Hines concert.

From 1969 to the early 1980s Mays worked as a studio session musician in Los Angeles. He has been an accompanist to singers Al Jarreau, Peggy Lee, Anita O'Day, Frank Sinatra, Sarah Vaughan and Dionne Warwick, and also worked with artists such as Don Ellis, Mel Lewis, Barry Manilow, Shelly Manne, Bob Mintzer, Red Mitchell, Gerry Mulligan, Art Pepper, Bud Shank, Bobby Shew, Sonny Stitt, Paul Winter, Phil Woods and Frank Zappa. In 1984, he moved to New York City and began to do more work as a bandleader, composer, and arranger. He has recorded over three dozen albums under his own name, and has been heard on hundreds more by others.

Discography

As leader
 A Musical Cocktail: The Music of Cole Porter (MCR, 1976)
 Two of a Mind with Red Mitchell (ITI, 1983)
 Tha's Delights with Shelly Manne, Andy Simpkins, Ralph Moore, Tom Harrell (Trend, 1985)
 One to One with Ray Drummond (DMP, 1990)
 One to One 2 with Ray Drummond (DMP, 1991)
 Kaleidoscope with Peter Sprague, Dick Oatts, Harvie Swartz, Jeff Hirshfield (The Jazz Alliance, 1992)
 Live At Maybeck - Concord Duo Series Volume Seven with Ed Bickert (Concord Jazz, 1994)
 Live At Maybeck (Concord Jazz, 1995)
 An Ellington Affair with Lewis Nash, John Goldsby(Concord Jazz, 1995)
 Mays in Manhattan with Marvin Stamm, Ed Neumeister, Jon Gordon, Sean Smith, Tim Horner (Concord Jazz, 1996)
 Out in Pa. with Matt Wilson, Martin Wind(No Blooze Music, 1999)
 By Ourselves with Marvin Stamm (Marstam, 2000)
 Summer Sketches (Palmetto, 2001)
 Going Home (Palmetto, 2003)
 Bick's Bag with Neil Swainson, Terry Clarke (Triplet, 2004)
 Live at Jazz Standard (Palmetto, 2005)
 Live at Birdland NYC, Stamm/Soph Project (Jazzed Media, 2005)
 Beyond the Red Door with Bud Shank (Jazzed Media, 2007)
 Stuffy Turkey with Joe La Barbera, Mattias Svensson (Five Stars Records, 2009)
 Blue Rondo a la Turk  with Keisuke Ohta (Five Stars Records, 2009)
 The Best Is Yet To Come  with Joe La Barbera, Rwu Kawamura (Five Stars Records, 2010)
 Mays at the Movies (SteepleChase, 2010)
 Phil & Bill with Phil Woods (Palmetto, 2011)
 Front Row Seat Solo (©Bill Mays, 2015)
 Live at COTA (No Blooze Music, 2019)
 Mays Plays Mays (No Blooze Music, 2019)

With Inventions Trio
 Fantasy (Palmetto, 2007)
 Delaware River Suite (No Blooze Music, 2008)
 Life's a Movie (Chiaroscuro, 2013)

With Road Work Ahead
 Night And Day (Trend, 1983)
 On The Road Again (SBE, 1998)
 Intersection (SBE, 2012)

As sideman
With Carter Burwell
 Gods and Monsters (RCA Victor/BMG, 1998)
 The Man Who Wasn't There (Decca, 2001)
 The Alamo (Hollywood, 2004)
 Hail Caesar! (Back Lot/Universal 2016)

With Elliot Goldenthal
 Cobb (Sony Classical, 1994)
 Interview with the Vampire (Geffen, 1994)
 Sphere (Varese Sarabande, 1998)

With Benny Golson
 California Message (Baystate, 1981)
 One More Mem'ry (Baystate, 1982)
 One Day, Forever (Arkadia, 2001)

With Bob Magnusson
 Revelation (Discovery, 1979)
 Two Generations of Music (Trend, 1982)

With Barry Manilow
 Even Now (Arista, 1978)
 One Voice (Arista, 1979)
 Barry (Arista, 1980)
 If I Should Love Again (Arista, 1981)
 I Wanna Do It with You (Arista, 1982)
 2:00 AM Paradise Cafe (Arista, 1984)

With Bud Shank
 Heritage (Concord Jazz, 1978)
 Crystal Comments with Bud Shank and Alan Broadbent (Concord Jazz, 1980)
 Explorations: 1980 with Bud Shank (Concord Concerto, 1980)
 Silver Storm (Raw, 2000)
 On the Trail (Raw, 2002)
 Fascinating Rhythms (Jazzed Media, 2009)

With Bobby Shew
 Class Reunion (Sutra, 1980)
 Outstanding in His Field (Inner City, 1980)
 Play Song (Jazz Hounds, 1981)
 Telepathy with Bobby Shew (Jazz Hounds, 1982)
 Shewhorn (Pausa, 1986)

With Frank Zappa
 Bognor Regis (Dragonfly, 2006)
 One Shot Deal (Zappa, 2008)
 Orchestral Favorites 40th Anniversary (Zappa, 2019)

With others
 Sarah Vaughan, A Time in My Life (Mainstream, 1971)
 Percy Faith, Corazon (CBS, 1973)
 Jose Feliciano, Just Wanna Rock 'n' Roll (RCA Victor, 1975)
 Marlena Shaw, Who Is This Bitch, Anyway? (Blue Note, 1975)
 Maxine Weldon, Alone On My Own (Monument, 1975)
 Jaye P. Morgan, Jaye P. Morgan (Candor, 1976)
 Andy Williams, Andy (Columbia, 1976)
 Joe Harnell, Harnell (Capitol, 1977)
 Leonard Cohen, Death of a Ladies' Man (Columbia, 1977)
 Lalo Schifrin, Rollercoaster (MCA, 1977)
 Larry Gatlin, Oh! Brother (Monument, 1978)
 The Manhattan Transfer, Extensions (Atlantic, 1979)
 Dionne Warwick, Dionne (Arista, 1979)
 Peter Sprague, The Path (Xanadu, 1980)
 Gordon Brisker, Collective Consciousness (Sutra, 1981)
 Mark Murphy, Bop for Kerouac (Muse, 1981)
 Howard Roberts, Turning to Spring (Discovery, 1981)
 Shelly Manne, Double Piano Jazz Quartet in Concert at Carmelo's (Trend, 1981)
 Shelly Manne, Double Piano Jazz Quartet in Concert at Carmelo's Vol. 2 (Trend, 1982)
 Freddie Hubbard, Ride Like the Wind (Elektra Musician, 1982)
 Beau Williams, Beau Williams (Capitol, 1982)
 Billy Preston, Pressin' On (Motown, 1982)
 Peter Sprague, Bird Raga (Xanadu, 1983)
 Wilton Felder, Gentle Fire (MCA, 1983)
 Lew Tabackin, My Old Flame (Atlas, 1983)
 Michael Vlatkovich, 9113 Michael Vlatkovich (Thank You Records, 1984)
 Morgana King, Simply Eloquent (Muse, 1986)
 Gerry Mulligan, Symphonic Dreams (PAR, 1987)
 Mark Murphy, Beauty And The Beast (Muse, 1987)
 Dianne Mower, A Song For You (Jazz City, 1990)
 Angelo Badalamenti, Twin Peaks Fire Walk with Me (Warner Bros., 1992)
 Sherrie Maricle, Live Concert (LRC, 1993)
 Jill O'Hara, Jill O'Hara (Sterling, 1993)
 Allen Mezquida, A Good Thing (Trouser Down, 1993)
 Martin Wind, Gone With The Wind (September, 1993)
 Gerry Mulligan, Dream a Little Dream (Telarc, 1994)
 Charles Cochran, Charles Cochran Meets Bill Mays (Audiophile, 2000)
 Bruce Eskovitz, Conversations (Azica, 2001)
 David Arnold, Changing Lanes (Varese Sarabande, 2002)
 Jack Walrath, Ballroom (SteepleChase, 2008)
 Yoshiaki Masuo, I'm Glad There Is You (Sunshine, 2009)
 Adam Unsworth, Balance (Acoustical Concepts Records, 2014)
 Phil Woods, Live at the Deer Head Inn (Deer Head, 2015)
 John Cacavas, Lalo Schifrin, Airport '77/The Concorde... Airport '79 (La-La Land, 2018)
 Dave Grusin, And Justice for All (Varese Sarabande, 2018)
 Art Pepper & Warne Marsh, Unreleased Art Volume 9 at Donte's, April 26, 1974 (Widow's Taste, 2016)
 P.J. Perry, This Quiet Room (Cellar Music, 2018)
 Philippe Sarde, Ghost Story (Quartet, 2019)
 Tommy Cecil, Side By Side-Sondheim (©Tommy Cecil, 2012)
 Tommy Cecil, Our Time-Sondheim Duos 2 (©Tommy Cecil, 2013)

External links
Official website
Barnes and Noble artist bio
New England Jazz History Database - Worcester Radio Interview
NAMM (National Association of Music Merchants) Oral History Program Interview June 8, 2005

American jazz pianists
American male pianists
1944 births
Living people
Musicians from Sacramento, California
Palmetto Records artists
20th-century American pianists
Jazz musicians from California
21st-century American pianists
20th-century American male musicians
21st-century American male musicians
American male jazz musicians